The Sacramento Geckos were an American soccer club that competed in the United Soccer Leagues from 1997 to 1999. The club was founded as the Albuquerque Geckos in Albuquerque, New Mexico in 1997, before being sold and moved to Sacramento, California for the 1999 season.

The Geckos had great success in their debut, winning the USL D-3 Pro League championship in 1997 before moving up to the tier 2 A-League in 1998. The team suffered a miserable season where they won only five games. The move to California didn't produce success, as the Geckos failed to win a game or survive the season, with the USL stepping in to buy the team, renaming them Team Sacramento before folding at the end of the 1999 campaign.

History

The Geckos emerged from a turbulent soccer history in New Mexico, following on the heels of a decade of semi-professional/professional club soccer in Albuquerque from 1986-1996 with the Albuquerque Outlaws, Albuquerque Gunners, New Mexico Roadrunners, & New Mexico Chiles. With this rich soccer history, Albuquerque and owner Al Valentine made the commitment to pro soccer with the debut of the Geckos in the USL D-3 Pro League in 1997. The team had instant success with a 15-3 (W-L) record, winning the league championship its first year.

Following this success, the team jumped up to tier 2 in the American soccer pyramid, joining the USL A-League for 1998. The club failed to produce similar results and, burdened with financial problems, were sold to a new ownership group in Sacramento, California. Doomed from the outset, the Sacramento Geckos struggled with the existing club debt and further poor results on the field, setting an all-time league record losing all 28 games and being outscored 91-16 for the year, lasting only half a season before the United Soccer Leagues were forced to buy the team, renaming them Team Sacramento. The team folded following the 1999 season.

Year-by-year

See also
Sacramento Scorpions
Sacramento Gold
New Mexico Chiles

References

G
Defunct soccer clubs in California
A-League (1995–2004) teams
1999 establishments in California
1999 disestablishments in California
Association football clubs disestablished in 1999
Soccer clubs in California
Association football clubs established in 1997